Tsiepfü Tsiepfhe Ward also AG is a ward located under Nagaland's capital city, Kohima. The ward falls under the designated Ward No. 15 of the Kohima Municipal Council and is sub-divided into three sub-wards: Upper Tsiepfü Tsiepfhe, Middle Tsiepfü Tsiepfhe and Lower Tsiepfü Tsiepfhe.

Education
Educational Institutions in Tsiepfü Tsiepfhe Ward:

Colleges 
 Model Christian College, Kohima

Schools 
 Azedon School
 Corragio School
 Tsiepfü Tsiepfhe Government Primary School
 Holy Family School
 Model Higher Secondary School
 Rosemount International Preschool

See also
 Municipal Wards of Kohima

References

External links
 Map of Kohima Ward No. 15

Kohima
Wards of Kohima